Phelps is an English surname. The name is originated as a patronymic form of the name Philip. The name Philip is derived from the Greek name Philippos, which is composed of two elements: the first, philein, "to love"; the second, hippos, "horse". The Dictionary of American Family Names states that the surname Phelps is generally found in the south-western part of England.

Notable people

Abel Mix Phelps (1851–1902), American surgeon
A. Warren Phelps (1829–1885), American politician
Almira Hart Lincoln Phelps (1793–1884), American educator, author, editor
Anson Greene Phelps (1781–1853), co-founder of mining company Phelps Dodge
Aurora Phelps (1839–1876), American land reformer, trade union labor and women's rights advocate
Austin Phelps (1820–1890), American clergyman and author of devotional and educational works, 19th century
Benjamin K. Phelps (1832–1880), New York County District Attorney
Bill Phelps (1934–2019), Lieutenant Governor of Missouri
Brian Phelps, radio personality
Martha Austin Phelps (1870–1933), American female chemist
Brian Phelps (diver), British former diver
Cameron Phelps, Australian rugby league footballer
Chance Phelps, US Marine killed in action in Iraq
Charles Phelps (politician) (1852–1940), first Connecticut Attorney General
Charles D. Phelps, American physician
Charles E. Phelps, American Civil War-era soldier and politician
Charles Phelps Taft, American lawyer and politician, brother of President Taft
Charles Phelps Taft II, Mayor of Cincinnati, son of President Taft
Christopher Phelps, American historian
David Phelps (disambiguation), several people
 David Phelps (musician) (born 1969), American Christian music vocalist and songwriter
 David Phelps (sport shooter) (born 1977), British sport shooter
 David Phelps (baseball) (born 1986), American baseball pitcher
 David D. Phelps (born 1947), U.S. Representative from Illinois
 David Sutton Phelps Jr. (1930–2009), American anthropologist
Dee Dee Phelps, American singer-songwriter and author
Digger Phelps, American basketball coach
Don Phelps, American football player
Ed Phelps, American baseball catcher
Edmund Phelps, Nobel Prize-winning economist at Columbia University
Edward H. Phelps, lieutenant colonel in the Union Army during the American Civil War
Edward John Phelps, late 19th-century American lawyer, diplomat and politician
Eleanor Phelps, American theatre, film and television actress
Elisha Phelps, United States Representative from Connecticut
Elizabeth Stuart Phelps Ward, American writer
Forrest Phelps American politician
Fred Phelps, the founding pastor of Westboro Baptist Church
George May Phelps, American inventor of automated telegraphy equipment
Isaac Newton Phelps Stokes, American architect
Jake Phelps, Editor in Chief of Thrasher Magazine
James and Oliver Phelps, identical twins and actors
Jaycie Phelps, American gymnast and Olympic gold medalist
Jeff Phelps, American sportscaster
Jill Farren Phelps, television producer 
John Phelps (disambiguation), several people
John Phelps (regicide) (1619–?), tried Charles I of England for high treason in 1649
John M. Phelps (1821–1884), Republican President of the West Virginia Senate
John S. Phelps (1814–1886), Governor of Missouri (1876–1881)
John W. Phelps (1813–1885), American Civil War general and presidential candidate
John E. Phelps (1839–1921), Union Army officer during the American Civil War
John Jay Phelps (1810–1869), American railroad baron and financier
Joseph Lee Phelps, Canadian farmer and political figure
Josh Phelps, Major League Baseball player
Kelly Joe Phelps, singer/songwriter, blues slide guitarist
Ken Phelps, Major League Baseball player
Kerryn Phelps, Australian doctor
Lancelot Phelps (priest) (1853–1936), British cleric and Provost of Oriel College, Oxford
Mark Phelps, American basketball coach
Matthew Phelps, Australian first-class cricketer
Michael Phelps, American swimmer, multi-Olympic medalist
Michael E. Phelps, inventor of Positron Emission Tomography 
Noah Phelps, American Revolutionary War-era soldier, spy, and politician
Noah Phelps (Wisconsin politician), American surveyor and politician
Oliver Phelps, American land speculator, settler and judge in New York
Orange Phelps, American politician and movie theater owner in Hillsboro, Oregon
Patricia Phelps de Cisneros, philanthropist
Peter Phelps, Australian actor
Phelps Phelps, 38th Governor of American Samoa and US Ambassador to the Dominican Republic
Phlash Phelps, American disc jockey
Ray Phelps, American baseball pitcher
Richard Phelps (artist), (1710–1785), English portrait artist
Richard Phelps (bell-founder), (c. 1670–1738), English maker of bells 
Richard Phelps (pentathlete), British athlete
Robert Phelps (disambiguation), several people
Robert Phelps (1926–2013), American mathematician
 Robert Phelps (academic) (1808–1890), British academic
 Robert Phelps (wrestler) (1890–?), British wrestler
 Robert Phelps (pentathlete) (born 1939), British modern pentathlete
Samuel Phelps, English actor
Samuel S. Phelps, United States Senator 
Sarah Phelps, British television, radio, film and freelance playwright 
Seth Ledyard Phelps, Union naval officer in the American Civil War
Shirley Phelps-Roper, daughter of Fred Phelps (above)
Timothy Guy Phelps, business executive and politician
Tommy Phelps (b. 1974), Major League Baseball pitcher
Walter Phelps (1832–1878), Union Army officer during the American Civil War
Wesley Phelps (1923–1944), Medal of Honor recipient
Willard Phelps (b. 1941), Yukon politician
William Phelps (disambiguation), many people
William Phelps (colonist) (1599–1672), one of the founders of Windsor, Connecticut
William Phelps (priest) (1797–1867), Church of England cleric
William E. Phelps (1835–?), American politician from Illinois
William F. Phelps (1822–1907), educational pioneer and author
William H. Phelps Sr. (1875–1965), American ornithologist and businessman.
William H. Phelps Jr. (1902–1988), Venezuelan ornithologist and businessman.
William J. Phelps (1808–1883), Illinois legislator
William Lyon Phelps (1865–1943), American author and critic
William Preston Phelps (1848–1917), American landscape painter
William Wallace Phelps (1826–1873), United States Representative from Minnesota
William Walter Phelps (1839–1894), United States Representative from New Jersey
W. W. Phelps (Mormon) (1792–1872), early convert and leader in the Latter Day Saint movement
M. William Phelps (born 1968), American crime writer and investigative journalist
Zach Phelps (1857–1901), American baseball principal owner

Fictional characters 

Cole Phelps, police detective in the 2011 video game L.A. Noire
Jim Phelps, a fictional character from the Mission: Impossible TV series
Mary Phelps, a fiction doctor from Casualty TV series
Sally Phelps, Tom Sawyer's aunt in Adventures of Huckleberry Finn

References

English-language surnames
Patronymic surnames
Surnames of English origin
Surnames from given names
de:Phelps
eo:Phelps
fr:Phelps
ko:펠프스
pl:Phelps
ru:Фелпс